Löscher may refer to:

 Peter Löscher
 Valentin Ernst Löscher